Walking the Line is an album by American country music artists Merle Haggard, George Jones, and Willie Nelson, released in 1987.

Background
Much like the successful seventies album Wanted! The Outlaws, Walking the Line features duets and solo cuts taken from various albums and repackaged as a single album. Jones and Haggard had recorded a duet album, A Taste of Yesterday's Wine in 1982 (the title cut having been by Nelson) while Haggard and Nelson had collaborated on Pancho & Lefty the same year. It reached number 39 on the Billboard country albums chart. All three artists had been under contract to CBS Records in the early eighties. The album does not feature a song with all three singing.

Reception

Track listing
"I Gotta Get Drunk" (Willie Nelson)
"No Show Jones" (George Jones, Glen Martin)
"Pancho & Lefty" (Townes Van Zandt)
"Yesterday's Wine" (Nelson)
"Half a Man" (Nelson)
"Big Butter and Egg Man (Armstrong, Venable)
"Heaven and Hell" (Nelson)
"Midnight Rider" (Gregg Allman)
"Are the Good Times Really Over (I Wish a Buck Was Still Silver)" (Merle Haggard)
"A Drunk Can't be a Man" (Jones, Earl Montgomery)

References

1987 compilation albums
Merle Haggard compilation albums
George Jones compilation albums
Willie Nelson compilation albums
Epic Records compilation albums